The Houston mayoral election of 2009 took place on November 3, 2009, to elect the successor to incumbent Mayor Bill White. White was ineligible for re-election, having served three terms. The race is officially nonpartisan. After no candidate received a majority of the votes, the top two candidates – City Controller Annise Parker and former City Attorney Gene Locke – faced each other in a runoff election on December 12, 2009. On November 11, councilman Peter Brown (who finished third in the first round) publicly endorsed Parker in the Mayor's race. Annise Parker won the run-off.

With the election, Houston became the largest city to elect an openly gay mayor.

Candidates
Candidates listed in order of how they appear on the official ballot.

City Councilman Peter Brown
Amanda Ulman
Luis Ullrich
Dan Cupp
Education Trustee Roy Morales
City Controller Annise Parker
Former City Attorney Gene Locke

Results

General election

Runoff results

Endorsements

Brown's endorsers include:
 State Representative Alma Allen
 Former Houston Police Chief C.O. Bradford
 Former Ambassador Edward Djerejian
 Former City Councilman Jim Greenwood
 Houston Councilman Jarvis Johnson
 Former Congressman Nick Lampson
 Congressman Solomon Ortiz
 Harris County Attorney Vince Ryan

Locke's endorsers include:
Activist Quanell X
Former Mayor Lee Brown
State Senator Rodney Ellis
Congressman Al Green
Former City Attorney Ben Hall
Former Mayor Bob Lanier

Morales's endorsers include:
Mayor of Katy Don Elder
Former Mayoral Candidate TJ Huntley
Former City Councilman Larry McKaskle
Former State Representative Martha Wong

Parker's endorsers include:
Former Congressman Chris Bell
City Councilman and Former Mayoral Candidate Peter Brown
Former City Councilman John Castillo
Former City Controller Leonel Castillo
State Representative Ellen Cohen
State Representative Garnet Coleman
State Representative Jessica Farrar
State Representative Scott Hochberg
City Councilwoman Toni Lawrence
City Councilwoman Sue Lovell
City Councilwoman Melissa Noriega
State Representative Rick Noriega
Former Ambassador Arthur Schechter
Former Mayor Kathy Whitmire
Houston Astros owner Drayton McLane

Polling

Pre-election polling

Aftermath
Parker was re-elected in 2011 and 2013. Locke served as Harris County interim commissioner in 2016, finishing the term of El Franco Lee, who had died unexpectedly in January of that year.

See also

2009 Houston elections

References

External links
Peter Brown
Gene Locke
Roy Morales
Annise Parker
Houston Chronicle special online section
Election Information

Mayoral election, 2009
2009 Texas elections
Houston
2009
Non-partisan elections